Beauquesne is a commune in the Somme department in Hauts-de-France in northern France. The name comes from the Picard for the oak tree, "quesne".

Geography
Situated at the junction of the D23 and the D31 roads, 17 miles to the north of Amiens

Population

See also
Communes of the Somme department

References

Communes of Somme (department)